The Ahmadiyya Anjuman Isha’at Islam Mosque  Keizerstraat is the headquarters of the Lahore Ahmadiyya Movement in Paramaribo in Suriname, the Surinaamse Islamitische Vereniging (SIV).
The mosque is located in the Keizerstraat, adjacent to the Neveh Shalom Synagogue.

History
The Muslim community of Paramaribo was established in 1929. Its first mosque, a wooden rectangular building with minarets, was completed in 1932. In 1979 boxing legend Muhammad Ali visited the mosque.

The current mosque was completed in 1984.

See also
 Islam in Suriname

References

External links

City of Paramaribo, Keizerstraat 88

Keizerstraat
Buildings and structures in Paramaribo
Mosques completed in 1984
Pakistani diaspora